Moonlight for Two is a 1932 Warner Bros. Merrie Melodies cartoon directed by Rudolf Ising. The short was released on June 11, 1932, and stars Goopy Geer, one of the few recurring characters in the early Merrie Melodies series.

Summary
The iris opens to a night-time scene, perhaps in the Ozarks or Appalachia, and the music of "She'll Be Coming 'Round the Mountain." Goopy Geer's nameless sweetheart comes out of a cabin scatting the music. Goopy himself stands by a tree unknowingly accompanying her on his harmonica before they meet. A songbird and her children trill a tune, "Moonlight for Two," which the happy couple pick up together, dancing about as the birds continue their accompaniment. The dancing ends when Goopy and the young lady hop onto a precarious wooden cart which, boarded, rolls down the hill at whose top it had been placed and through a cabin whose formation is confounded by the impact and whose logs, sent into the air, fall to earth again in a neat pile. The ungoverned cart crashes into a tree but reassembles into a perfect wheelbarrow, now bearing only the girl and pushed along by Goopy; across a plank bridge merrily they roll along, the bridge yielding to their weight not to the point of breaking but only bending enough that the happy couple are wetted by the shallow water beneath. We cut to a large cabin, where a square dance is taking place: amongst other partners, two donkeys dance, their tails joining to form a makeshift jump-rope for a kitten; a goat-like fiddler continually resins his bow between his toes.

Outside, our two darlings arrive; gentleman Goopy helps his lady out of the wagon and onto the porch of the cabin and he, ascending the steps, miraculously shrinks from his lofty height to a shape squat and round; this he amends by doffing his hat and pulling his long ears skyward. "Howdy, folks!" cries Goopy as he and his lady enter. The couple dance as the band play the title piece. The cabin's stove enters the number, dancing for a bit, then refreshing itself by quaffing coals. A canine couple caper excitedly; as they reach a table in the corner of the room, the boy takes a barrel of moonshine therefrom and, partaking thereof, finds his lanky body burnt, as a cigar, to a butt. Goopy Geer snaps his fingers madly, and produces a rhythm by pulling a lever on and thereby releasing the ash from his new dance-partner, the stove.
A dishevelled villain enters with a shotgun; he lowers at Goopy's sweetheart, whereupon Goopy orders him to stand back. This challenge is met with shotgun bursts and our hero staggers back from the scene, stepping in a pair of spittoons and falling back on the table. He frees the spittoons from his feet, flinging them at the cackling cad. Goopy runs to his stunned foe and they rumble! Goopy at a disadvantage, the stove challenges the villain: it burns the brute's behind and breathes fire to the villain's slight retreat. The beast lowers at his adversaries; Goopy cleverly takes the lever of the stove and with it fires hot coals at the invader who, yelping with pain, retreats. Our hero and his helper shake hands. Victory!

Falsetto
Goopy Geer's speaking-voice in this cartoon is a falsetto, characteristic of Bosko (as played by Carman Maxwell), the star of the main star of the contemporary Looney Tunes series. This is interesting as, in the earlier Goopy Geer film, the  voice of the character was deep and raspy.

This is reminiscent of Bosko's own change from the speech exemplified in Sinkin' in the Bathtub (the first Looney Tune) and Bosko, the Talk-Ink Kid to the better-known falsetto that he uses from Congo Jazz onward. Goopy's singing voice remains much as it was in the earlier short.

References

External links
 
 

1932 films
1932 animated films
Films scored by Frank Marsales
Films about music and musicians
Films directed by Rudolf Ising
Animated films about dogs
Films set in the United States
Merrie Melodies short films
American black-and-white films
1930s Warner Bros. animated short films